Padang Ganting is a district of Tanah Datar Regency, in the West Sumatra province of Indonesia.

It is subdivided into two  (villages): Padang Ganting and Atar.

References

Districts of West Sumatra